This list contains all cultural property of national significance (class A) in the canton of Schaffhausen from the 2009 Swiss Inventory of Cultural Property of National and Regional Significance. It is sorted by municipality and contains 47 individual buildings, 7 collections and 18 archaeological finds.

The geographic coordinates provided are in the Swiss coordinate system as given in the Inventory.

Dörflingen

Gächlingen

Hallau

Hemishofen

Lohn

Löhningen

Merishausen

Neuhausen am Rheinfall

Neunkirch

Oberhallau

Ramsen

Rüdlingen

Schaffhausen

Schleitheim

Siblingen

Stein am Rhein

Stetten

Thayngen

Wilchingen

References
 All entries, addresses and coordinates are from:

External links
 Swiss Inventory of Cultural Property of National and Regional Significance, 2009 edition:

PDF documents: Class B objects
Geographic information system